Let the Music Play may refer to:

Let the Music Play (Barry White album), 1976
"Let the Music Play" (Barry White song), the title track song from that same album
Let the Music Play (single album) (Giorgio Moroder), 1977
Let the Music Play (Shannon album), 1984
"Let the Music Play" (song), a 1983 song by Shannon
Let the Music Play (Stan Walker album), 2011
"Let the Music Play" (Busker Dave), 2014